Parliamentary elections were held in Egypt on 21 December 1929. The result was a victory for the Wafd Party, which won 198 of the 236 seats, including 102 seats in which their candidates were returned unopposed. Four independents were also returned unopposed.

The election was boycotted by the Liberal Constitutionalist Party, and only 26 Ittihad Party and four Watani Party candidates contested the election.

Results

References

Egypt
Elections in Egypt
1929 in Egypt
December 1929 events
Election and referendum articles with incomplete results